The 35th Arizona State Legislature, consisting of the Arizona State Senate and the Arizona House of Representatives, was constituted in Phoenix from January 1, 1981, to December 31, 1982, during the second two years of Bruce Babbitt's first full term as Governor of Arizona. Both the Senate and the House membership remained constant at 30 and 60, respectively. The Republicans maintained their 16–14 edge in the upper house, and gained a seat in the lower house, increasing their majority there to 43–17.

Sessions
The Legislature met for two regular sessions at the State Capitol in Phoenix. The first opened on January 12, 1981, and adjourned on April 25, while the Second Regular Session convened on January 11, 1982, and adjourned sine die on April 24. There were seven Special Sessions during this legislature. The first convened on July 7, 1981, and adjourned sine die on September 4; the second convened on July 8, 1981, and adjourned seventeen days later on July 25; the third convened that same year on September 1 and adjourned sine die on September 3; the fourth convened on November 9, 1981, at 9:00 in the morning, and adjourned that same day at 4:24 in the afternoon; the fifth and sixth special sessions were held concurrently from December 1, 1981, through January 11, 1982; the seventh and final special session convened on December 1, 1981, and adjourned later that month on December 7.

State Senate

Members

The asterisk (*) denotes members of the previous Legislature who continued in office as members of this Legislature.

House of Representatives

Members 
The asterisk (*) denotes members of the previous Legislature who continued in office as members of this Legislature.

The ** denotes that she died in office on July 30, 1981, and was replaced by the appointment of David M. Rodriguez

References

Arizona legislative sessions
1981 in Arizona
1982 in Arizona
1981 U.S. legislative sessions
1982 U.S. legislative sessions